Susanne Kos (born 5 January 2000 Blaricum ) is a Dutch volleyball player, who plays as a libero. She is a member of the Women's National Team.

Career
She participated in the 2018 FIVB Volleyball Women's Nations League.
She plays for Talent Team Papendal.

References

External links
FIVB profile
CEV profile
 http://www.bvbinfo.com/player.asp?ID=15438 

2000 births
Living people
Dutch women's volleyball players
Liberos
People from Blaricum
Sportspeople from North Holland